Macarena Ceballos (born 12 January 1995) is an Argentine swimmer. She competed in the women's 100 metre breaststroke event at the 2017 World Aquatics Championships.

References

1995 births
Living people
Argentine female swimmers
Place of birth missing (living people)
South American Games silver medalists for Argentina
South American Games medalists in swimming
Competitors at the 2014 South American Games
Swimmers at the 2015 Pan American Games
Swimmers at the 2019 Pan American Games
Argentine female breaststroke swimmers
Pan American Games competitors for Argentina
21st-century Argentine women